Fredella Avenue Historic District is a national historic district located at Glens Falls, Warren County, New York.  It includes eight contributing buildings. They are multi-story concrete residential buildings built as speculative housing for Italian immigrant families. They are built of molded concrete block and decorated with cast concrete trim and characterized by two story porches with concrete fluted columns. They were built between 1914 and 1918 and located based on their proximity to local stone quarries.

It was added to the National Register of Historic Places in 1984.

See also
 National Register of Historic Places listings in Warren County, New York

References

Houses on the National Register of Historic Places in New York (state)
Historic districts on the National Register of Historic Places in New York (state)
Neoclassical architecture in New York (state)
Historic districts in Warren County, New York
Houses in Warren County, New York
National Register of Historic Places in Warren County, New York